Haagse Voetbalvereniging Te Werve is a football club based in the  neighbourhood of Rijswijk, Netherlands. The club plays in the Tweede Klasse, the seventh tier of Dutch football.

History 
HVV Te Werve was founded on 1 September 1916 as a club owned by Shell. After having played football in The Hague for many years, the club's board made the decision to return to Rijswijk in 2014. Since then, matches have been held at Sportpark Vredenburch in the Te Werve neighbourhood of the town.

In the 2018–19 KNVB Cup, HVV Te Werve reached the first round of the main tournament before losing 7–0 to national champions Ajax.

Honours

References

External links 
 Club website 

Football clubs in South Holland
Football clubs in the Netherlands
1916 establishments in the Netherlands
Association football clubs established in 1916
Sport in Rijswijk